Body Kiss is the 29th studio album by The Isley Brothers on the DreamWorks label. Almost solely written, arranged, composed and produced by longtime collaborator R. Kelly as well as hitmakers Tim & Bob, the album yielded the singles "What Would You Do?" and "Busted". It became the first album since the band's 1975 album The Heat Is On to hit number one on the album charts. It also became the first Isley Brothers album to debut at number-one and has since been certified gold by the RIAA. Other hits were the radio-ready "Prize Possession".

Track listing

Personnel 

 Steve Bearsley – Assistant
 Jacquie Carter – A&R
 Rodney East – Keyboards
 Tim Kelley – Mixing, Arranger, Producer, Keyboards, Drum Programming
 Bob Robinson – Arranger, Producer, Guitar
 Andy Gallas – Engineer
 Abel Garibaldi – Programming, Engineer, Mixing
 Şerban Ghenea – Mixing
 Jason Groucott – Assistant
 Andy Heller – Assistant Engineer
 Ernie Isley – Guitar, Soloist
 Ronald Isley – Lead and Background Vocals, Executive Producer
 Bernard Jacobs – Stylist
 Kandy Johnson – Background Vocals

 Kim Johnson – Background Vocals
 Jeff Jones – Make-Up
 R. Kelly – Arranger, Background Vocals, Producer, Executive Producer, Mixing, Introduction
 Gregg Landfair – Guitar
 Donnie Lyle – Bass, Guitar
 John McClain – Executive Producer
 Ian Mereness – Programming, Engineer, Mixing
 Kendall D. Nesbitt – Keyboards
 Frances Pennington – Creative Director
 Mikel Pickett – Assistant
 Herb Powers – Mastering
 Reisig – Photography
 Tim Roberts – Assistant
 Jennifer Scott – A&R

Charts

Weekly charts

Year-end charts

Certifications

References

2003 albums
Albums produced by R. Kelly
Albums produced by Tim & Bob
The Isley Brothers albums
DreamWorks Records albums